Lisa Ecker (born 19 September 1992) is an Austrian female artistic gymnast, representing her nation in international competitions. She participated at the 2015 World Championships in Glasgow, and eventually qualified for 2016 Summer Olympics in Rio de Janeiro, finishing forty-third in the preliminary phase of the women's artistic gymnastics with an all-around score of 52.966.

References

External links 
  
 

1992 births
Living people
Austrian female artistic gymnasts
Sportspeople from Linz
Gymnasts at the 2015 European Games
European Games competitors for Austria
Gymnasts at the 2016 Summer Olympics
Olympic gymnasts of Austria
21st-century Austrian women